Henry McKee Minton (25 December 1870 - 29 December 1946) was an African-American doctor who was one of the founders of Sigma Pi Phi and was Superintendent of the Mercy Hospital of Philadelphia for twenty-four years.

Early years
Henry McKee Minton was born on 25 December 1870 in Columbia, South Carolina, son of Sawyer Theophilus Minton and Jennie McKee Minton, both from Philadelphia.
His father was a lawyer.  Henry was an only child.
He took the name of his uncle Henry Minton (1811-1875), a founder of the caterer's trade guild in Philadelphia, who had become a prosperous businessman.
His grandfather on his mother's side was Colonel John McKee.  McKee had come to Philadelphia from Virginia in the 1840s, become a waiter and then the owner of restaurants before moving into real estate and reputedly becoming a very wealthy man.

He began to attend public schools in Washington, D.C. at the age of five.  He spent two years in the Academy of Howard University, then studied at Phillips Exeter Academy in New Hampshire, graduating in 1891.  He played a prominent role among the student body of Exeter.  He was assistant managing editor of the Exonian and managing editor of the Literary Monthly.
He was president of the debating society, co-editor of the Pean and class orator at his commencement.

Minton then spent a year studying law at the University of Pennsylvania, followed by three years studying pharmacy at the Philadelphia College of Pharmacy.
He graduated with a Ph.G. degree in 1895. 
In 1897 he opened a drugstore, the first in Philadelphia to be operated by an African American.
Colonel McKee died in April 1902.
According to newspaper reports, he was "the richest coloured man in America."
In his will, Colonel McKee left very little of his money to his family and other acquaintances, leaving most of his fortune to the Roman Catholic Church to build a college for orphans, despite having no prior connection to that church.
After some dispute, Henry Minton obtained $25,000 from the estate, which proved much smaller than had been rumored.
This was still a very large amount of money at the time.

Leaving the drugstore, in 1902 Minton was admitted to Jefferson Medical College.

Sigma Pi Phi
On 15 May 1904 Minton co-founded Sigma Pi Phi, also called the Boulé, the first Black Greek letter fraternity.
The other founders were Algernon B. Jackson, Edwin C. Howard and Richard J. Warrick.
At that time, fraternities were important in helping people develop contacts that would assist them in their careers.
The Boulé was to grow into an exclusive and influential national organization.
Minton gave the purpose as to "bind men of like qualities, tastes and attainments into close sacred union, that they might know the best of one another."

He said that new members should not be "selected on the basis of brains alone, but in addition to congeniality, culture, and good fellowship, they should have behind them [at initiation] a record of accomplishments, not merely be men of promise and good education."
Minton was the first grand sire archon.
He helped organize the second chapter in Chicago in 1907.
Sigma Pi Phi is the oldest surviving Black Greek letter fraternity, with 5,000 members as of 2008.

Career
Minton graduated in 1906 as an M.D.
In 1906 he became the first pharmacist for the Douglass Hospital, which had been founded in 1895 by Dr. Nathan F. Mossell and was the first hospital in Philadelphia for African Americans.  Later he became secretary of the hospital's Board of Directors.
A second hospital for African Americans, the Mercy Hospital, was organized by Dr. Eugene T. Hinson and other Philadelphia community leaders and opened in 1907.  Minton's father was a member of the Board of Directors of the Mercy Hospital.
The hospital moved to West Philadelphia in 1919.  In 1920 Minton succeeded Algernon B. Jackson as superintendent on the recommendation of Dr. Hinson.
He held this position for the next 24 years, during which time many interns and nurses received their training at the hospital.
He was also a member of the staff of the Henry Phipps Institute, which was famous for its treatment of tuberculosis, from 1915 until he died in 1946.

Henry married Edith Wormley, daughter of the wealthy owners of a large hotel in Washington.
He died in the Mercy hospital on 29 December 1946 following a heart attack.
His wife had died in Washington the previous September.

Bibliography

Notes and references
Notes

Citations

Sources

 
 
 
 
 
 
 

1870 births
1946 deaths
African-American physicians
American hospital administrators
People from Columbia, South Carolina
Phillips Exeter Academy alumni
University of Pennsylvania alumni
University of the Sciences alumni
Physicians from Pennsylvania
Physicians from South Carolina
20th-century African-American people
McKee family